(16 March 19164 January 2010) was a Japanese marine engineer and a survivor of both the Hiroshima and Nagasaki atomic bombings during World War II. Although at least 70 people are known to have been affected by both bombings, he is the only person to have been officially recognized by the government of Japan as surviving both explosions.

A resident of Nagasaki, Yamaguchi was in Hiroshima on business for his employer Mitsubishi Heavy Industries when the city was bombed at 8:15 AM, on 6 August 1945. He returned to Nagasaki the following day and, despite his wounds, he returned to work on 9 August the day of the second atomic bombing. That morning, while he was being told by his supervisor that he was "crazy" after describing how one bomb had destroyed the city, the Nagasaki bomb detonated. In 1957, he was recognized as a hibakusha ("explosion-affected person") of the Nagasaki bombing, but it was not until 24 March 2009, that the government of Japan officially recognized his presence in Hiroshima three days earlier. He died of stomach cancer on 4 January 2010, at the age of 93.

Early life
Yamaguchi was born on 16 March 1916 in Nagasaki.  He joined Mitsubishi Heavy Industries in the 1930s and worked as a draftsman designing oil tankers.

Second World War
Yamaguchi said he "never thought Japan should start a war". He continued his work with Mitsubishi Heavy Industries, but soon Japanese industry began to suffer heavily as resources became scarce and tankers were sunk. As the war dragged on, he was so despondent over the state of the country that he considered honor killing his family with an overdose of sleeping pills in the event that Japan lost.

Hiroshima bombing
Yamaguchi lived and worked in Nagasaki, but in the summer of 1945 he was in Hiroshima for a three-month-long business trip. On 6 August,  he was preparing to leave the city with two colleagues, Akira Iwanaga and Kuniyoshi Sato, and was on his way to the train station when he realized he had forgotten his hanko (a type of identification stamp common in Japan) and returned to his workplace to get it. Yamaguchi recalls seeing the bomber and two small parachutes, before there was "a great flash in the sky, and I was blown over". The explosion ruptured his eardrums, blinded him temporarily, and left him with serious radiation burns over the left side of the top half of his body. After recovering, he crawled to a shelter and, having rested, he set out to find his colleagues. They had also survived and together they spent the night in an air-raid shelter before returning to Nagasaki the following day. In Nagasaki, he received treatment for his wounds and, despite being heavily bandaged, he reported for work on 9 August.

Nagasaki bombing
At 11:00 AM on 9 August 1945, Yamaguchi was describing the blast in Hiroshima to his supervisor, when the American bomber Bockscar dropped the Fat Man atomic bomb over the city. His workplace again put him 3 km from ground zero, but this time he was unhurt by the explosion. However, he was unable to replace his now ruined bandages and he suffered from a high fever and continuous vomiting for over a week.

Later life
During the Allied occupation of Japan, Yamaguchi worked as a translator for the occupation forces. In the early 1950s, he and his wife, who was also a survivor of the Nagasaki atomic bombing, had two daughters. He later returned to work for Mitsubishi designing oil tankers. When the Japanese government officially recognized atomic bombing survivors as hibakusha in 1957, Yamaguchi's identification stated only that he had been present at Nagasaki. He was content with this, satisfied that he was relatively healthy, and put the experiences behind him.

As he grew older, his opinions about the use of atomic weapons began to change. In his eighties, he wrote a book about his experiences (Ikasareteiru inochi ("A Life Well-Lived")), as well as a book of poetry, and was invited to take part in a 2006 documentary about 165 double A-bomb survivors (known as nijū hibakusha in Japan) called Twice Survived: The Doubly Atomic Bombed of Hiroshima and Nagasaki, which was screened at the United Nations. At the screening, he pleaded for the abolition of atomic weapons.

Yamaguchi became a vocal proponent of nuclear disarmament. He told an interviewer "The reason that I hate the atomic bomb is because of what it does to the dignity of human beings". Speaking through his daughter during a telephone interview, he said, "I can't understand why the world cannot understand the agony of the nuclear bombs. How can they keep developing these weapons?"

On 22 December 2009, Canadian film director James Cameron and author Charles Pellegrino met Yamaguchi while he was in a hospital in Nagasaki and discussed the idea of making a film about nuclear weapons.  "I think it's Cameron's and Pellegrino's destiny to make a film about nuclear weapons", Yamaguchi said.

Recognition by government
At first, Yamaguchi did not feel the need to draw attention to his double survivor status.  However, in later life he began to consider his survival as destiny, so in January 2009, he applied for double recognition. This was accepted by the Japanese government in March 2009, making Yamaguchi the only person officially recognised as a survivor of both bombings.  Speaking of the recognition, he said, "My double radiation exposure is now an official government record. It can tell the younger generation the horrifying history of the atomic bombings even after I die".

Health
Yamaguchi lost hearing in his left ear as a result of the Hiroshima explosion. He also went bald temporarily and his daughter recalls that he was constantly swathed in bandages until she reached the age of 12. Despite this, Yamaguchi went on to lead a healthy life. Late in his life he began to suffer from radiation-related ailments, including cataracts and acute leukemia.

His wife also suffered radiation poisoning from black rain after the Nagasaki explosion and died in 2008 (age 88) of kidney and liver cancer. All three of their children reported suffering from health problems they blamed on their parents' exposures.

Death

In 2009, Yamaguchi learned that he was dying of stomach cancer. He died on 4 January 2010, in Nagasaki at the age of 93.

BBC controversy
On 17 December 2010, the BBC featured Yamaguchi in its comedy programme QI, referring to him as "The Unluckiest Man in the World". Both Stephen Fry, the host of QI, and celebrity guests drew laughter from the audience in a segment that included examples of black humor such as asking if the bomb had "landed on him and bounced off". A clip from the episode was uploaded by the BBC after the show but was later deleted. A BBC spokesperson told Kyodo News, "We instructed our crew to delete the file since we have already issued a statement that the content was not appropriate".

The episode triggered criticism in Japan. Toshiko Yamasaki, Yamaguchi's daughter, appeared on NHK's national evening news and said: "I cannot forgive the atomic bomb experience being laughed at in Britain, which has nuclear weapons of its own. I think this shows that the horror of atomic bomb is not well enough understood in the world. I feel sad rather than angry".

The Japanese Embassy, London, wrote to the BBC protesting that the programme insulted the deceased victims of the atomic bomb. It was reported that Piers Fletcher, a producer of the programme, responded to complaints with "we greatly regret it when we cause offence" and "it is apparent to me that I underestimated the potential sensitivity of this issue to Japanese viewers".

On 22 January 2011, the BBC and Talkback Thames jointly issued a statement. In addition to the joint statement, the BBC delivered a letter from Mark Thompson, Director-General of the BBC, to the Japanese Embassy.

See also
 Effects of nuclear explosions
 Effects of nuclear explosions on human health
 Jacob Beser, the only member of the strike crews for both Hiroshima and Nagasaki

Notes

References

External links
 Nagasaki University Peace Studies Archives June 2011 YAMASAKI, Toshiko and HARADA, Kosuzu "Living with a double A-bomb survivor"  
 YAMAGUCHI, Tsutomu "Double A-Bomb Victim: My Life beneath the Atomic Clouds" 2007

Japanese anti–nuclear weapons activists
People from Nagasaki Prefecture
1916 births
2010 deaths
Hibakusha
Deaths from stomach cancer
Deaths from cancer in Japan
Mitsubishi Heavy Industries people
Japanese engineers
Marine engineers